Mujahideen Victory Day is a political holiday observed in all parts of Afghanistan, falling on the 28 April each year. It commemorates the day when Mujahideen rebel forces overthrew the Communist regime in 1992. It is celebrated mostly by former Mujahideen in Afghanistan. Some Afghans are against celebrating the day because it marks the start of civil war.

Current festivities
2012: Cancelled due to security reasons, threats by Taliban insurgents.
2007: Afghan President Hamid Karzai awarded medals to Mujahideen veterans in commemoration of the holiday.
2006: Karzai gave a public speech at Kabul's Chaman-e-Hozori park
Also on Victory Day 2006, Afghan parliament member and activist Malalai Joya stood to denounce alleged mujahideen atrocities, and was threatened with death by other parliament deputies. Reporters without Borders journalist Omid Yakmanish was beaten by two parliamentarians while attempting to film the debate.

History
After the monarchy in Afghanistan the Marxist People's Democratic Party of Afghanistan was born took power making Afghanistan a communist country. This did not fare well with the people. The Afghans, especially in the rural areas, viewed the new government as un-Islamic.

At this point the Cold War was going on and due to the USSR being right on the border of a communist Afghanistan they supported them. Meanwhile, the US was supporting the Mujahideen resistance causing a civil war between the government and the resistance. This civil war left the country in ruins and gave birth to Al-Qaeda.

In total, approximately one million casualties occurred due to the war and the holiday marks the end of one of the country's most deadly conflicts.

See also
Afghan Independence Day
Durrani Empire
Hotaki dynasty

References

April observances
Victory days
Public holidays in Afghanistan
Mujahideen